Alan Bond (1938–2015) was an Australian businessman.

Alan Bond is also the name of:

 Alan Bond (engineer) (born 1944), British aerospace engineer
Alan Bond, British jockey who was British flat racing Champion Apprentice
Alan Bond, musician on Blackgrass album